Redang Airport  is an airport on Redang Island, Kuala Nerus District, Terengganu, Malaysia. The airport was briefly closed in 2009 for runway expansion, reopening on April 16, 2009.

The runway lies along the base of a long ridge immediately to the west. Another ridge runs parallel  to the east. South approach and departure are over the water.

Airlines and destinations

Traffic and statistics

Traffic

Statistics

See also
Transport in Malaysia
List of airports in Malaysia

References

External links
SkyVector - Pulau Redang Airport
Short Take-Off and Landing Airports (STOL) at Malaysia Airports Holdings Berhad

Airports in Terengganu
Kuala Nerus District